The Journal of World History is a peer-reviewed academic journal that presents historical analysis from a global point of view, focusing especially on forces that cross the boundaries of cultures and civilizations, including large-scale population movements, economic fluctuations, transfers of technology, the spread of infectious diseases, long-distance trade, and the spread of religious faiths, ideas, and values.

The journal was established in 1990 by Jerry H. Bentley at the University of Hawaii to serve as the official journal of the World History Association. It is published by the University of Hawaii Press. Initially produced twice a year, it became a quarterly in 2003.

In 2000, it was included in Project MUSE, which now contains archives going back to vol. 7 (1996). In 2009, it was included in JSTOR, with a moving wall of 3 years.

External links
 
 World History Association

References 

World history
History journals
Publications established in 1990
University of Hawaiʻi Press academic journals
Quarterly journals
English-language journals
1990 establishments in Hawaii
Academic journals published by university presses